Grace Bell McCance Snyder (April 23, 1882 – December 8, 1982), is an American quilter, former pioneer and centenarian, whose story is known through the books No Time on My Hands and Pioneer Girl: Growing Up on the Prairie.

Biography

Childhood
Grace McCance went to Nebraska with her parents in 1885 to homestead in a sod house in Custer County. She had nine siblings. As a small child, she pieced quilt blocks while tending the family's cows.

Adulthood
McCance married Bert Snyder in 1903 and lived on a ranch forty miles (70 km) northwest of North Platte, where they raised four children: Nellie Snyder Yost, Miles, Billie, and Bertie.

The relatively isolated ranch life gave McCance ample time for quilting, and she became nationally recognized for the skill and complexity of her quilts. The Congress of Quilters Hall of Fame in Arlington, Virginia, inducted her in 1980, as did the Nebraska Quilters Hall of Fame in 1986.

McCance lived to be 100 years old. She is buried in North Platte Cemetery in North Platte, Nebraska.

Books
McCance is remembered by her own memoir No Time On My Hands as told to her daughter Nellie Snyder Yost. 
Her story is also told in the children's biography Pioneer Girl: Growing Up on the Prairie by Andrea Warren (Morrow Junior Books, 1998).

Sources
 Grace McCance Snyder at www.nebraskapress.unl.edu
 Grace McCance Snyder at Find a Grave
 Grace McCance Snyder at andreawarren.com
 Grace McCance Snyder at storytorch.squarespace.com
 Stories of Nebraska Quilters at nequilters.org

References 

1882 births
1982 deaths
Quilters
American pioneers
American centenarians
People from Cass County, Missouri
People from Custer County, Nebraska
Women centenarians